Consonant mutation is change in a consonant in a word according to its morphological or syntactic environment.

Mutation occurs in languages around the world. A prototypical example of consonant mutation is the initial consonant mutation of all modern Celtic languages. Initial consonant mutation is also found in Indonesian or Malay, in Nivkh, in Southern Paiute and in several West African languages such as Fula. The Nilotic language Dholuo, spoken in Kenya, shows mutation of stem-final consonants, as does English to a small extent. Mutation of initial, medial and final consonants is found in Modern Hebrew. Also, Japanese exhibits word medial consonant mutation involving voicing, rendaku, in many compounds. Uralic languages like Finnish show consonant gradation, a type of consonant mutation.

Similar sound changes 
Initial consonant mutation must not be confused with sandhi, which can refer to word-initial alternations triggered by their phonological environment, unlike mutations, which are triggered by their morphosyntactic environment. Some examples of word-initial sandhi are listed below.
Example: un [b]arco 'a boat', mi [β]arco 'my boat'. This also occurs in Hebrew (as begedkefet, an acronym for the consonants this affects), Aramaic, and Tamil.
Scottish Gaelic: in some dialects, stops in stressed syllables are voiced after nasals, e.g. cat  'a cat', an cat  'the cat'.

Sandhi effects like these (or other phonological processes) are usually the historical origin of morphosyntactically triggered mutation. For example, English fricative mutation (specifically, voicing) in words such as house [haus], plural houses [hauzɪz] and house (verb) [hauz] originates in an allophonic alternation of Old English, where a voiced fricative occurred between vowels (or before voiced consonants), and a voiceless one occurred initially or finally, and also when adjacent to voiceless consonants. Old English infinitives ended in -(i)an and plural nouns (of Class One nouns) ended in -as. Thus, hūs 'a house' had , and hūsian 'house (verb)' had ; however,  the plural of hūs was hūs, being a neuter noun of the strong a-stem class. During the Middle English period, hous~hus, as part of the loss of gender and erosion of endings, developed plural variation, retaining hous [hu:s], the dative plural housen [hu:zən], which became extended to a general plural, and over time taking on the es plural from Old English Class 1 nouns, thus houses [hu:zəz].  After most endings were lost in English, and the contrast between voiced and voiceless fricatives partly phonemicized (largely due to the influx of French loanwords), the alternation was morphologized.

Examples

English 

In Old English, velar stops were palatalized in certain cases but not others. That resulted in some alternations, many of which have been levelled, but traces occur in some word doublets such as ditch  and dike .

 seek  : sought 
 think  : thought 

The pair teach  : taught  has a combination of both this and palatalization.

A second palatalization, called yod-coalescence, occurs in loanwords from Latin.
 confess  : confession 
 fuse  : fusion 

Another unproductive layer results from the Vulgar Latin palatalization of velar stops before front vowels.
 induce  : induction 
 magic  : magus 

 act  : action

Celtic languages 

The Celtic languages are well-known for their initial consonant mutations. The individual languages vary on the number of mutations available: Scottish Gaelic has one, Irish and Manx have two, Welsh, Cornish and Breton have four (if mixed mutations are counted). Cornish and Breton have so-called mixed mutations; a trigger causes one mutation to some sounds and another to other sounds. Welsh also has a mixed mutation (triggered by na, ni and oni). The languages vary on the environments for the mutations, but some generalizations can be made. Those languages all have feminine singular nouns  mutated after the definite article, with adjectives mutated after feminine singular nouns. In most of the languages, the possessive determiners trigger various mutations. Here are some examples from Breton, Irish, Scottish Gaelic, and Welsh:

Older textbooks on Gaelic sometimes refer to the c → ch mutation as "aspiration", but it is not aspiration in the sense of the word used by modern phoneticians, and linguists prefer to speak of lenition here.

Historically, the Celtic initial mutations originated from progressive assimilation and sandhi phenomena between adjacent words. For example, the mutating effect of the conjunction a 'and' is from the word once having the form *ak, and the final consonant influenced the following sounds.

Welsh 
Welsh has three main classes of initial consonant mutation: soft mutation; nasal mutation; and aspirate mutation, which is sometimes called spirant mutation. The fourth category is mixed mutation, which calls for a aspirate mutation if possible but otherwise a soft mutation. The following tables show the range of Welsh mutations with examples. A blank cell indicates that no change occurs.

{| class="wikitable"
|- style="background: #efefef;"
! Radical
! Soft
! Nasal
! Aspirate
|-
| p 
| b 
| mh 
| ph 
|-
| t 
| d 
| nh 
| th 
|-
| c 
| g 
| ngh 
| ch 
|-
| b 
| f 
| m 
| 
|-
| d 
| dd 
| n 
| 
|-
| g 
| *
| ng 
|
|-
| m 
| f 
| 
| 
|-
| ll 
| l 
|
|
|-
| rh 
| r 
|
|
|-
| ts 
| j 
|
|
|}

*Soft mutation causes initial  to be deleted. For example,  "garden" becomes  "the garden", and  "work" becomes  "his work".

{| class="wikitable"
|- style="background: #efefef;"
! Radical
! Soft
! Nasal
! Aspirate
! English
|-
| plant 
| blant 
| mhlant 
| phlant 
| children
|-
| tref tŷ 
| dref dŷ 
| nhref nhŷ 
| thref thŷ 
| townhouse
|-
| coeden 
| goeden 
| nghoeden 
| choeden 
| tree
|-
| brawd 
| frawd 
| mrawd 
| 
| brother
|-
| dŵr 
| ddŵr 
| nŵr 
| 
| water
|-
| gwaith glas gorsaf 
| waith las orsaf 
| ngwaith nglas ngorsaf 
|
| workbluestation
|-
| mawr 
| fawr 
| 
| 
| big, large
|-
| llan 
| lan 
|
|
| parish
|-
| rhywbeth 
| rywbeth 
|
|
| something
|-
| tsips 
| jips 
|
|
| chips
|}

The mutation ts → j corresponds to the t → d mutation and reflects a change heard in modern words borrowed from English. Borrowed words like  (chips) can often be heard in Wales.  'I'm going to get (some) chips';  'I have chips'. However, the ts → j mutation is not usually included the classic list of Welsh mutations and is rarely taught in formal classes. Nevertheless, it is a part of the colloquial language and is used by native speakers.

h-prothesis 
h-prothesis is a phenomenon in Welsh in which a vowel-initial word becomes h-initial. It occurs after the possessive pronouns  'her',  'our', and  'their':  'age',  'her age' (c.f.  'his age'). It also occurs with  'twenty' after  'on' in the traditional counting system:  'twenty-one', literally "one on twenty".

Irish 
Irish has two consonant mutations: lenition ( [ˈʃeː.vʲuː]) and eclipsis ( [ˈʊ.ɾˠuː]).

Lenition 
Lenition is indicated by an h following the consonant in question or, in some older typefaces and texts, by a dot (◌̇) above the letter that has undergone lenition. The effects of lenition are as follows:

 A stop becomes a fricative. Voicing is retained, as is place of articulation except for the coronals.
 → 
 → 
 → 
 → 
 → 
 → 
 → , 
 → 
 → 
 → 
 → 
 → 

Eclipsis 
The following tables show how eclipsis affects the start of words. Eclipsis is symbolised in the orthography by adding a letter, or occasionally two letters, to the start of the word. If the word is to be capitalised, the original first letter is capitalised, not the letter or letters added for eclipsis. An example is the "F" in Ireland's national anthem, Amhrán na bhFiann.

Russian 
In Russian, consonant mutation and alternations are a very common phenomenon during word formation, conjugation and in comparative adjectives.

The most common classes of mutations are the alternation between velar and postalveolar consonants:
   →  
   →  
   →  , as in  "quiet" and  "quieter"
Gain or loss of palatalization:  "tsar" and  "of the tsar" (adjective)

Other common mutations are:
  →   (or less frequently щ ),   →  
  →  ,   →  ,   →  
  →  : плеск → плещет "splash" / "(he) splashes",   →  : свистеть → свищу "to whistle" / "I whistle"

Hebrew 
Modern Hebrew shows a limited set of mutation alternations, involving spirantization only. The consonants affected may be stem-initial, stem-medial, or stem-final.

For a more in depth discussion of this phenomenon, see Begadkefat.

Japanese 
Rendaku, meaning "sequential voicing," is a mutation of the initial consonant of a non-initial component in a Japanese compound word:
 nigiri + sushi → nigirizushi ("grip (with the hand)" + "sushi" → "hand-shaped sushi")
 nigori + sake → nigorizake ("muddy" + "rice wine" → "unfiltered sake")

Uralic languages 

Word-medial consonant mutation is found in several Uralic languages and has the traditional name of consonant gradation. It is pervasive, especially in the Samic and Finnic branches.

Finnish 

Consonant gradation involves an alternation in consonants between a strong grade in some forms of a word and a weak grade in others. The consonants subject to graduation are the plosives (p, t, k) that are followed by a vowel and preceded by a vowel, a sonorant (m, n, l, r), or h. The strong grade usually appears in a open syllable or before a long vowel.

The gradation of loanwords may include gradation of the plosives that are not native to Finnish:

Burmese 
Burmese exhibits consonant mutation, involving voicing in many compound words.

The primary type of consonant mutation is that if two syllables are joined to form a compound word, the initial consonant of the second syllable becomes voiced. The shift occurs in these phones:
 → 
 → 
 → 
 → 
 → 
 → 

Examples:
 +  >  ("medicine" + "room" → "clinic")

The second type of consonant mutation occurs when the phoneme  after the nasalized final  becomes a  sound in compound words.

Examples:

The third type of consonant mutation occurs when phonemes , after the nasalized final , become  in compound words:

 +  >  ("to consult")
 +  >  ("to apologize")
 +  >  ("airplane")

Southern Oceanic languages 
Mutation of the initial consonant of verbs is a feature of several languages in the Southern Oceanic branch of the Austronesian language family.

Central Vanuatu 
Initial consonant mutation occurs in many Central Vanuatu languages like Raga:

 nan vano "I went"
 nam bano "I go"

Those patterns of mutations probably arose when a nasal prefix, indicating the realis mood, became combined with the verb's initial consonant. The possible ancestral pattern of mutation and its descendants in some modern Central Vanuatu languages are shown below:

New Caledonia 
Initial consonant mutation also serves a grammatical purpose in some New Caledonian languages. For example, Iaai uses initial consonant mutation in verbs to distinguish between specific/definite objects and generic/indefinite objects:

Those forms likely derive from an earlier reduplication of the first syllable in which the interconsonantal vowel was deleted, resulting in a spirantization of the formerly reduplicated consonant.

Dholuo 

The Dholuo language (one of the Luo languages) shows alternations between voiced and voiceless states of the final consonant of a noun stem. In the construct state (the form that means 'hill of', 'stick of', etc.) the voicing of the final consonant is switched from the absolute state. (There are also often vowel alternations that are independent of consonant mutation.)
 'hill' (abs.), god (const.)
 'stick' (abs.), luð (const.)
 'appearance' (abs.), kit (const.)
 'bone' (abs.),  (const.)
buk 'book' (abs.), bug (const.)
 'book' (abs.),  (const.)

Fula 

Consonant mutation is a prominent feature of the Fula language. The Gombe dialect spoken in Nigeria, for example, shows mutation triggered by declension class. The mutation grades are fortition and prenasalization:

For example, the stems rim- 'free man' and  'person' have the following forms:
 (class 2), dimo (class 1), ndimon (class 6)
 (class 2), gimɗo (class 1), ŋgimkon (class 6)

Indonesian and Malay 
The active form of a multisyllabic verb with an initial stop consonant or fricative consonant is formed by prefixing the verb stem with meN- in which N stands for a nasal sharing the same place of articulation as the initial consonant:

garuk → menggaruk (= to scratch), hitung → menghitung (= to count),
beri → memberi (= to give), fitnah → memfitnah (= to accuse falsely),
cari → mencari (= to search), dapat → mendapat (= to obtain), *jangkau → menjangkau (= to reach)

An initial consonant that is an unvoiced stop or s is deleted, leaving only the nasal in its place.

kandung → mengandung (= to contain or to be pregnant),
putih → memutih (= to turn white),
satu → menyatu (= to become one / to unite),
tulis → menulis (= to write).

Applied to verbs starting with a vowel, the nasal is realized as ng .

Monosyllabic verbs add an epenthetic vowel before prefixing and produce the prefix menge-:

bor (= boring tool / drill) → mengebor (= to make a hole with drill).

Verbs starting with a nasal or approximant consonant do not add any mutant nasal, only me-.

The colloquial language drops me- prefix but tends to replace it with nasalization:

tanya → menanya → nanya
pikir → memikir → mikir
merepotkan → ng(e)repotin

Latvian 
More information is available in the Latvian Wikipedia.

Also two consonants can mutate as a group.

Ute 
In Ute, also called Southern Paiute, there are three consonant mutations, which are triggered by different word-stems, The mutations are spirantization, gemination, and prenasalization:

For example, the absolutive suffix -pi appears in different forms, according to the noun stem to which it is suffixed:
movi-ppi 'nose'
sappI-vi 'belly'
-mpi 'tongue'

See also 
 Lenition
 Fortition
 Consonant gradation
 Rendaku
 Sonority hierarchy
 Apophony
 Elision
 Historical linguistics

References

Further reading 
Grijzenhout, Janet. 2011. 'Consonant Mutation' in Marc van Oostendorp, Colin J. Ewen, Elizabeth Hume and Keren Rice (eds.) The Blackwell Companion to Phonology (Oxford: Blackwell) III: 1537-1558.
Zimmer, Stefan. The Celtic Mutations: some typological comparisons. A Companion in Linguistics, a Festschrift for Anders Ahlqvist, ed. B. Smelik, R. Hofman, C. Hamans, D. Cram. Nijmegen: de Keltische Draak / Münster: Nodus 2004, 127-140.

Celtic languages
Linguistic morphology
Phonology
Syntax